The World IMP Pairs Championship is a contract bridge competition established in 1998 by the World Bridge Federation. Since then it has been a major side event in the quadrennial meet that is now called the "World Bridge Series Championships", "World Bridge Series", or "World Series".

It is open to all players without preregistration and about 15% of the pairs were transnational in the 2010 rendition.

World championship status of the IMP Pairs may be doubted or tentative for it is not explicitly listed as one of the constituent World Bridge Series Championships (nor directly listed in the side menu).

Results

In 1998 there were 160 pairs completed play on day one of whom 149 continued on day two.

In 2002 146 and 130.

There were 213 entries in 2006 of which 72 advanced to the final and 42 to the consolation. Four years later there were only 163 entries of which 73 advanced to the final.

1998 World Series components
This section in progress extends the footer Note. When complete most of it must move to our general coverage of the new so-called World Series.

IMP Pairs. The world championship status of this event is debatable and it may be debated by WBF online editors! The first two renditions covered above are from 1998 and 2002, whose tournament record is "No Data Found" online. (Select the event name in the Ekeblad record; see also the IMP Pairs To Date table.) The player record for Ekeblad does include his 1998 win. ... perhaps medalists alone are in the database?

Contemporary coverage.
What is covered on page one of the contemporary website? 10th Championships 1998 (page one) - linked schedule at bottom of page
pictures the gold medalists in knockout Teams and matchpoint Pairs, Open and Women flights (4 events);
names the gold medalist Seniors, both teams and pairs, and Mixed Pairs (3 events);
names the gold pair in the unheralded "Junior Triathlon" (one secondary event).

As listed in the three-column schedule (bottom of the same page), those are 3 Team Events (9-, 8-, and 4-day), 4 Pair Events (7-, 7-, 4-, and 3-day), and 1 Other Events (three Triathlon components over five days).Alternatively, 7 events plus the complex triathlon result.

The schedule "Days and Rounds" (bottom of page) lists nine more events whose winners are not pictured or named on page one.
Teams (2): two-day junior (J), two-day zonal (Z)
Pairs (4): one-day zonal mixed (ZM), two-day junior (J), two-day zonal open (ZO), two-day IMP (IMP)
Other (3+): two-day Par + Booklet, 11-day Continuous Pairs, one-day Junior Individual [with Triathlon results]
That is 16 events in all, 17 results including the triathlon complex.

Results - typically covering the final session and overall
TEAM
 Junior Triathlon teams ; 116+ players
 Zonal Teams 

PAIR
(major) Mixed Pairs 

 Zonal Mixed Pairs 
 Junior Triathlon pairs ; 132 players
 Zonal Open Pairs 
 IMP Pairs ; 160 pairs yesterday, evidently no cut

OTHER
 Jean Besse Par Contest  - linked to list of all players; evidently include 1 of 4 women placed
 Continuous Pairs - skip that (six and five days, 22 session results with no overall standings online)
 Junior Triathlon individual ; 112
 Junior Triathlon overall  - the winners did not score points in the Individual segment; first in Teams, second in Pairs!

Daily (for the Bulletin, select the date from the schedule)
Thu 0827 No.: 7 • Thursday, 27 August 1998

Notes

References

External links
 at the World Bridge Federation —no data before 2006

IMP Pairs